Henry Lawrence Faulkner (January 9, 1924 – December 3, 1981) was a Kentucky-born artist and poet known as an eccentric rebel and bohemian. Faulkner is best known for his wildly colorful oil paintings and eccentric acts, including his bringing a bourbon-drinking goat to parties and art shows. He was a close friend of Tennessee Williams, who called him "a creative poet and artist." 

Born on January 9, 1924, in Holland, Kentucky, Faulkner went on to study as a scholarship student at the Louisville School of Art. Around the 1959, Faulkner started to exhibit his paintings more frequently, which were often compared to the Surrealist and Colorist movements and linked to famed artists such as Gustav Klimt. It is said he took inspiration from sources ranging from California to Italy, but his most popular works are abstractions of scenes in his native Kentucky. Today, his works are in the collections of the Morris Museum of Art in Morristown, NJ, and The Johnson Collection in Spartanburg, SC, among others.

Faulkner died in a car accident in Lexington, Kentucky, on December 3, 1981.

In 2014, the Faulkner Morgan Archive, Inc. was created, in part, to help preserve Henry Faulkner's legacy.

References 

https://web.archive.org/web/20090902031756/http://geocities.com/unusualkentucky/henryfaulkner.html

1924 births
1981 deaths
American artists
Artists from Kentucky
People from Kentucky
Road incident deaths in Kentucky